Iyo is a language spoken in the Madang Province of Papua New Guinea that comes from the Trans-New Guinea language family. Iyo also goes by the names Bure, Naho, Nabu, and Nahu. It has about 6,900 speakers. The Iyo language was previously known as Nahu because the first discovered speakers of the language lived in villages along the Nahu river. The name changed due to other communities speaking the same language but having different names for it. It was decided to call the language 'Iyo', which is the word for 'yes', after the leaders in the communities agreed to it.

Speakers 
The Iyo people live in a society that values equality. Before the Lutheran church's influence, families would live in small settlements across mountainous regions. Around the mid-1950s, villages were created with a local church acting as the center of the village. Over time, villages became more religiously diverse and gained contact with other cultures. The village houses are almost entirely made out of resources from the forests around the mountain with the exception of nails, hinges, and a corrugated metal roof from time to time. The Iyo people typically ate root vegetables such as taro and sweet potato. They also at corn, beans, and fruit when there was no taro and sweet potato. They farm these crops in a 'slash and burn' style on the mountain slopes. Pigs are also raised in small amounts and are saved for fests during special occasions. Sometimes they would grow coffee and vanilla beans to trade with other groups in the area.

Phonology

Consonants 
The Iyo language contains 15 consonants. One more phoneme that is represented by 'dz' can sometimes occur due to the close relationship between the Iyo language and the Kate language. This sound only appears in some names so it is not included. The phoneme 's' represents two different sounds. One is the conventional 's' sound and the other one creates a 'ts' sound. Similar to 's', the phoneme 'r' also represents two different sounds. These two sounds are 'r' and 'l'.

Vowels 
The Iyo language contains 5 vowels. The phoneme 'e' makes an 'ɛ' sound if it is before the consonants 'p', 'b', 't', 'd', 'r', 's', or 'z' along with stressed syllables before 'k'.

Syllables 
The syllables in Iyo follow a general rule of a consonant followed by a vowel. There are a few times where there will be two vowels clustered together (ex. ae, ia, ou, ua.), but consonants must be separated by a vowel in between.

Stress 
Iyo has a predictable stress pattern where the second to last syllable, or the penultimate syllable, contains primary stress. In addition, secondary stress is on the fourth and sixth syllables if there is any.

Nasalisation 
Most vowels in Iyo are nasalized if they are found in stressed syllables. Nasaliation is a feature on some roots and suffixes. Nasalisation can occur when syllables contain a voiceless sound and is attached to a root or suffix like 'ka' in 'kato', 'awa' in 'awando', and 'pare' in 'pareke'.

Counters 
The Iyo language follows a base five counting system. After the number five, the number six is thought of as five plus one (ex. 'kandeka' means five 'kande saŋiyo kanata' means six but is literally translated to five plus one). The counting system uses hands and legs to communicate numbers from one to twenty (ex. 'nimi kini' means four and is translated to 'without the thumb', 'kande irisa' means ten and is translated to 'two hands' and 'khe kande soso' means twenty and is translated to 'all legs and hands'). In addition, adding 'qu' after a number turns it into an ordinal number (ex. 'kandeka' means five and 'kandeka qu' means fifth). The only exceptions to this is 'first', 'second', and 'third' where a possessive suffix is included. This counting system is not being used too frequently. Instead, the counting system of Tok Pisin has been adopted and is more commonly used.

Verbs 
There are two distinct types of verbs in Iyo. In a sentence, it is common to have multiple verbs with at least one being a medial verb, and one final verb. A medial verb uses a suffix to connect the subject of a verb to another verb while a final verb uses a suffix to identify the tense, and number of the subject.

Word Order 
Iyo does not have a specific word order that it follows. Depending on the sentence, the word order can change from a Subject Object Verb (SOV) order to an Object Subject Verb (OSV) order.

Subject Object Verb 
SVO word order is the most common word order found in Iyo.

ex. 'No   kombono     qare       seqanowo'

1S moon-LOC   cuscus  look.for-PST-1s-RPST

'I hunted cuscus in the moonlight.'

Object Subject Verb 
OSV word order is a rare occurrence that can happen when the subject is the focus of the sentence. When this happens, the subject word and object word can swap places, however both ways are acceptable.

ex. 'Kopore  mira      pokamote.'

S          O             V

cloud    ground  cover0PRES-2/3s

'Clouds are covering the ground.'

'Mira        kopore       pokamote.'

O              S                 V

ground    cloud     cover-PRES-2/3s

'Clouds are covering the ground.'

In this case, both sentences are acceptable.

Word Tense 
There are four different tenses in Iyo. The tense of a sentence can be distinguished by the final verb.

Remote Past 
The remote past tense is used when the speaker is talking about something that happened two or more days ago from the time in the narrative.

ex. 'Nuwi qenero'

cousin-3sPOSS see-PST-2/3s-RPST

'He saw his cousin.'

Past 
Past tense refers to a time range from a few hours ago to yesterday. Past tense is typically not used in stories unless it is in direct quotes from someone in the story. The context of a story uses remote past tense while a quote from someone in the story uses past tense.

ex. 'Sira rimiyaŋgo ŋu naŋge qeneroqo sira sowe tero rimiyoteŋgo'

taro plant-CONT-PST-2/3p DEM DISC see-SS-SUB taro continuation do-SS plant-CONT-PRES-2/3p

'Seeing it simply as the type of taro they always planted they added it to the taro they are planting now.'

Present 
Present tense refers to another range of time from a few hours ago to the current time. It can refer to something that is in the process of happening or something that has recently happened.

ex. 'ŋu iŋoteno'

DEM know-PRES-1s

'I understand that.'

Future 
Future tense is used when something will probably happen in the near to distant future. It is commonly used when a specific time is not known.

ex. 'Balusi naru kano areweya ŋu Seweko o siyoni uweya'

airplane time INDEF-LOC come.up-FUT-2/3s DEM Sewe-TOP things get.PLOBJ-3sDS go.down-FUT-2/3s

'At whatever time the plane will come up, Sewe will get their things and it will go down.'

Sentence Types 
The Iyo language has three basic types of sentences. More complex sentences are chains of these sentence types.

Declarative 
Declarative sentences are sentences used to state something.

ex. 'Dopeke     koya              Takeme        koya                   tokono         oriyo'

Dopeke      TOP-ACC     Takeme        TOP-ACC        forest-ALL    go.up-PST-2/3d-RPST

'Dopeke and Takeme went up to the forest.'

Imperative 
Imperative sentences are technically sentence fragments due to the final verb in a sentence being implied. Since there is no final verb stated in the sentence, imperative sentences end with a medial verb.

ex. 'Asa,     ye     woso        kutaqemo       mahika.'

alright   2P     pull        nearby-ALL  come-2pIMP-SEQ

'Alright, you all come up close beside me.'

Interrogative 
Interrogative sentences often have interrogative pronouns and typically have a rising intonation that drops at the end of the question.

ex. 'Kopipe                   neweya?'

coffee-YNQ     3sDO-drink-FUT-2/3s

'Will you drink some coffee?'

Spatial words 
Spatial words in Iyo are based on the speaker or the person being spoken to. Due to the mountainous region that most of the people who speak Iyo live in, spatial words identify objects that are higher, lower, across, beside, or behind the recipient, and if the object is close or far.

Loan Words 
There are a few occurrences of loan words in Iyo. Most of the words come from Tok Pisin since it is a more dominant language and is used for wider communication (ex. 'keseti' is taken from the word 'keset' in Tok Pisin which means cassette, 'sipeti' is taken from the word 'spet' in Tok Pisin which means spade, and 'balusi' is taken from the word 'balus' in Tok Pisin which means 'airplane'. Most of the loan words are for objects that never had a word in Iyo before.

ex. 'Balusi          bukimŋaro'

airplane  make.booking-3sDO-PST-2/3s-RPST

'He booked a plane.'

References 

Finisterre languages
Languages of Morobe Province